Ctenophorus infans, the Laverton ring-tailed dragon, is a species of agamid lizard occurring around Laverton and the Mount Margaret Goldfield of Western Australia.

It was formerly considered to be a subspecies of Ctenophorus caudicinctus.

References

Agamid lizards of Australia
infans
Endemic fauna of Australia
Reptiles described in 1967
Taxa named by Glen Milton Storr
Reptiles of Western Australia